The 2018–19 Swiss Cup was the 94th season of Switzerland's annual football cup competition. The competition began on 18 August 2018 with the first games of Round 1 and ended on 19 May 2019 with the final. The Super League side Zürich were the defending champion but they were eliminated by Basel in the semi-final on 25 April 2019 and bring the Basel won their 13th Swiss Cup title.

Participating clubs
All teams from 2017–18 Super League and 2017–18 Challenge League as well as the top 4 teams from 2017–18 Promotion League automatically entered this year's competition. The remaining 41 teams had to qualify through separate qualifying rounds within their leagues. Reserve teams and teams from Liechtenstein are not allowed in the competition, the latter only enter the 2018–19 Liechtenstein Cup.

TH Title holders.

Round 1
Teams from Super League and Challenge League were seeded in this round. In a match, the home advantage was granted to the team from the lower league, if applicable. Teams in bold continue to the next round of the competition.

|-
| colspan="3" style="background:#9cc;"|18 August 2018

|-
| colspan="3" style="background:#9cc;"|19 August 2018

|}

Round 2
The winners of Round 1 played in this round. Teams from Super League were seeded, the home advantage was granted to the team from the lower league, if applicable. Teams in bold continue to the third round.

|-
|colspan="3" style="background-color:#99CCCC"|14 September 2018

|-
|colspan="3" style="background-color:#99CCCC"|15 September 2018

|-
|colspan="3" style="background-color:#99CCCC"|16 September 2018

|}

Round 3
The winners of Round 2 played in this round. No team was seeded, the home advantage was granted to the team from the lower league, if applicable. Teams in bold continue to the quarter-finals.

|-
|colspan="3" style="background-color:#99CCCC"|31 October 2018

|-
|colspan="3" style="background-color:#99CCCC"|1 November 2018

|}

Quarter-finals
The winners of Round 3 played in this round. No team was seeded, the home advantage was granted to the team from the lower league, if applicable. Teams in bold continue to the Semi-finals.

|-
|colspan="3" style="background-color:#99CCCC"|27 February 2019

|-
|colspan="3" style="background-color:#99CCCC"|28 February 2019

|-
|colspan="3" style="background-color:#99CCCC"|6 March 2019

|}

Semi-finals

|-
|colspan="3" style="background-color:#99CCCC"|23 April 2019

|-
|colspan="3" style="background-color:#99CCCC"|25 April 2019

|}

Final

|-
|colspan="3" style="background-color:#99CCCC"|19 May 2019

|}

References

External links
 Official site 
 Official site 
 Official site 

Swiss Cup seasons
Swiss Cup
Cup